Staten Island light rail proposals refer to two projects in the New York City borough of Staten Island.  These proposals are among the several light rail projects that have been floated in New York City in recent years. Neither proposal was funded in the Metropolitan Transportation Authority's 2015–2019 Capital Plan, but $4 million was allocated to a study for it.

North Shore 
The North Shore Light Rail line is a proposed rail line (since turned into a bus rapid transit line) serving the northern portion of Staten Island along the abandoned right of way of the former Staten Island Railway's North Shore Branch. According to PlanNYC.org, which is affiliated with the Robert F. Wagner Graduate School of Public Service at New York University, "[t]he proposed five mile route, which would connect Arlington and the St. George Ferry Terminal, would cost $360 million, with funding coming from federal, state and local agencies. In order to move forward, the project will require a $4 million allocation from Congress for a feasibility study which is currently awaiting approval from the House Transportation Committee. A projection of 11,000–15,000 daily passengers would ride on the North Shore Light Rail if and when it is complete. This line would serve the North Shore.

An option that was considered was light rail transit, due to its ability to operate with cars in mixed traffic. There was a plan to run the line down South Avenue from the Arlington station to the Teleport. The line would rise to street level at Arlington. Due to freight trains laying up as far west as Union Avenue, the line would have to be physically separate from the freight line or the cars would have to be built to a higher crash standard. Comments included begin raising the line at Union Avenue, since it would have to go to street level anyway, to avoid interference with the freight line.

Some advocates of improved mass transit on the island oppose the plan, however, preferring instead the option of through service between Arlington and Tottenville via the existing Staten Island Railway, this made possible by the installation of the Ball Park loop in 2001 (since discontinued but still intact).

A 2012 alternatives analysis identified bus rapid transit (Select Bus Service) rather than light rail as the preferred alternative for the region. The bus service was eventually selected. About $356 million is needed to complete the line, which will run on the North Shore Branch right-of-way, adjacent to the Kill van Kull. $5 million was allocated in the 2015–2019 Capital Program for environmental and design work. In July 2018, the MTA indicated that it was retaining a consultant to advise on an environmental impact assessment for the bus rapid transit line on the North Shore Branch.

West Shore and Kill van Kull 

Beginning at the South Shore, probably near a park-and-ride in Pleasant Plains, the proposed line would run along New York State Route 440, according to an alignment decision in March 2009. It would cross over the Bayonne Bridge to connect to the Hudson-Bergen Light Rail in Bayonne, New Jersey.

Construction of this line could begin as soon as 2018, and serve the new Freshkills Park, but SIEDC needs $5 million in funding to complete studies for the route of the line; a campaign to raise the $5 million failed previously, but was restarted in August 2014. The line would serve 9,000 more Staten Island workers, 65,000 more Staten Island residents, and 25,000 more households. As part of the 2015–2019 MTA Capital Program, $4 million has been allocated for the alternative analysis of light rail on the West Shore of Staten Island.

Kill van Kull transit 
In September 2007, bus service  was introduced between Richmond Avenue in Staten Island and the 34th Street station. , weekday peak limited stop service from Staten Island terminates at 34th Street with a connection to the Hudson-Bergen Light Rail to Exchange Place.

The Bayonne Bridge was originally built to accommodate two extra lanes that could be used for light rail service. While not having begun any studies, New Jersey Transit was investigating the feasibility of extending HBLR from the 8th Street Station across the raised bridge. It is not clear whether such a system would fall under the supervision of the Metropolitan Transportation Authority, although this is likely. Completing any such extension would involve a collaboration between New Jersey Transit, New York State, and New York City. The development of a Staten Island light rail system which could connect with the HBLR system has gained political support in New York. US Senator Robert Menendez supported the HBLR extension conceptually, but questioned the benefit for New Jersey.

Another proposal for transit over the Kill van Kull is an aerial gondola connecting Bayonne and the North Shore.

See also 
 Mass transit in New York City
 History of New York City transportation
 Transportation in New York City

References

Further reading
 Restoring Staten Island's Rail Connections
 Borough President Molinaro to MTA: "light rail users strongly support Bayonne bus service"

External links
 West Shore Light Rail Project—description from the Staten Island Economic Development Corporation
 http://www.auto-free.org/lrt-staten.html

Passenger rail transport in New York City
Proposed railway lines in New York (state)
Staten Island Railway